Ornichia is a plant genus in the gentian family (Gentianaceae), tribe Exaceae. The genus is endemic to Madagascar.

Species
Three species are accepted:

 Ornichia lancifolia (Baker) Klack.
 Ornichia madagascariensis (Baker) Klack.
 Ornichia trinervis (Desr.) Klack.

References 

Gentianaceae
Endemic flora of Madagascar
Gentianaceae genera